Lionel Gatford may refer to:
 Lionel Gatford (priest, died 1665), royalist Church of England clergyman
 Lionel Gatford (priest, died 1715), English Anglican priest, Archdeacon of St Albans